The Count of Saint Germain (German: Der Graf von Saint Germain) is a 1948 novel by the Austrian writer Alexander Lernet-Holenia. It regained the author's pre-war popularity and dealt with the issues of the Anschluss and war guilt.

References

Bibliography
 Robert von Dassanowsky. Austrian Cinema: A History. McFarland, 2005.

1948 novels
Austrian novels
Novels by Alexander Lernet-Holenia